Anthony LeBlanc is a Canadian sports executive who has served as the President of Business Operations with the Ottawa Senators of the National Hockey League since April 20, 2020 and Alternate Governor since December 8, 2020. He served as the president, CEO, and alternate governor of the NHL's Arizona Coyotes from 2013 to 2017 and from 2017 to 2020 was the lead spokesman for Schooners Sports and Entertainment, an ownership group that is looking to bring a Canadian Football League expansion team to the Halifax, Nova Scotia area.

He served as the Vice President of Global Sales at BlackBerry Limited from 2000 to 2008.

References

External links
Anthony LeBlanc's staff profile at Eliteprospects.com

Year of birth missing (living people)
Living people
Arizona Coyotes executives
National Hockey League team presidents
People from Baie-Comeau